The Americas Zone is one of the three zones of regional Davis Cup competition in 2011.

In the Americas Zone there are four different groups in which teams compete against each other to advance to the next group.

The Division III tournament was held in the Week commencing 13 June 2011 at Santa Cruz, Bolivia

Participating teams

Format
The eight teams were split into two groups and played in a round-robin format. The top two teams of each group advanced to the promotion pool, where the two top teams will be promoted to the Americas Zone Group II in 2012. The last two placed teams of each group from the preliminary round were relegated into the relegation pool, where the two bottom teams will be relegated to the Americas Zone Group IV in 2012.

It was played on 15–18 June 2011 at the Club de Tenis Santa Cruz in Santa Cruz, Bolivia on outdoor clay courts.

Group A

Guatemala vs. Honduras

Costa Rica vs. Jamaica

Guatemala vs. Jamaica

Costa Rica vs. Honduras

Guatemala vs. Costa Rica

Jamaica vs. Honduras

Group B

Bahamas vs. Aruba

Bolivia vs. Barbados

Bolivia vs. Bahamas

Barbados vs. Aruba

Bahamas vs. Barbados

Bolivia vs. Aruba

Promotion pool
Results and points from games against the opponent from the preliminary round were carried forward.

Guatemala vs. Bolivia

Costa Rica vs. Barbados

Guatemala vs. Barbados

Bolivia vs. Costa Rica

Relegation pool
Results and points from games against the opponent from the preliminary round were carried forward.

Jamaica vs. Aruba

Honduras vs. Bahamas

Jamaica vs. Bahamas

Honduras vs. Aruba

References

External links
Davis Cup draw details

Americas Zone Group III
Davis Cup Americas Zone